Associação Acadêmica e Desportiva Vitória das Tabocas, commonly known as Vitória das Tabocas, or as Acadêmica Vitória, is a Brazilian men's and women's football club based in Vitória de Santo Antão, Pernambuco state. The women's team competed once in the Copa do Brasil de Futebol Feminino

History
The club was founded on May 6, 2008.

Men's team
Vitória das Tabocas won the Campeonato Pernambucano Second Level in 2008.

Women's team
It also finished fourth in the continental competition, the 2012 Copa Libertadores Femenina and participated in the 2014 edition.

They finished runners-up in the 2013 Copa do Brasil de Futebol Feminino.

Former players

Stadium
Associação Acadêmica e Desportiva Vitória das Tabocas play their home games at Estádio Municipal Severino Cândido Carneiro, nicknamed Carneirão. The stadium has a maximum capacity of 8,000 people.

Achievements

 Campeonato Pernambucano Second Level:
 Winners (1): 2008

References

Football clubs in Pernambuco
Women's football clubs in Brazil
Association football clubs established in 2008
2008 establishments in Brazil